A cabana is a type of shelter often found near beaches or pools. A cabana can be used to relax in the shade or change clothes.

A cabana bathroom is a bathroom attached to a building or a house that is commonly used by swimmers and beachgoers.

See also
 Cabana boy
 Canopy
 Gazebo
 Vernacular architecture

References

Coastal construction
Garden features
Huts
Pavilions
Swimming pools
Vernacular architecture